William Falconer (or Falconar) (1707–1784) was a Scottish clergyman who served as the Bishop of Moray (1742–1778), Primus of the Scottish Episcopal Church (1762–1782) and Bishop of Edinburgh (1776–1784).

Life
He was the son of Alexander Falconer, an Elgin merchant, and Jean King. His grandfathers were the Right Reverend Colin Falconer, Bishop of Argyll (1679–80) and Bishop of Moray (1680–86), and William King of Newmill, Provost of Elgin (1690–1700).

After his ordination on 10 June 1728, he was the Chaplain of Balgowan (1728–35), Minister of Forres (1735–42), and Minister of Elgin (1740–46).

He was appointed coadjutor bishop of Caithness and Orkney and consecrated at Alloa on 10 September 1741 by Thomas Rattray, Primus of the Scottish Episcopal Church, with bishops Robert Keith and Robert White serving as co-consecrators.

He was elected the Bishop of Moray on 10 November 1742, and accepted the see on 12 January 1743. He left Elgin in 1746 and took up residence in Edinburgh. He was unanimously elected Primus of the Scottish Episcopal Church at Forfar on 24 June 1762, and also became the Bishop of Edinburgh on 25 October 1776. He resigned the see of Moray before May 1778 and the office of Primus in September 1782, but retained the see of Edinburgh.

Bishop Falconer died in office on 15 June 1784, aged 77.

Styles
 1707–1728: William Falconer, Esquire.
 1728–1741: The Reverend William Falconer.
 1741–1762: The Right Reverend William Falconer.
 1762–1782: The Most Reverend Willam Falconer.
 1782–1784: The Right Reverend William Falconer.

References 

 
 
 

1707 births
1784 deaths
Bishops of Moray
Bishops of Edinburgh
Primuses of the Scottish Episcopal Church
18th-century Scottish Episcopalian bishops